The Nakajima A2N or Navy Type 90 Carrier Fighter was a Japanese carrier-borne fighter of the 1930s.  It was a single-engined biplane of mixed construction, with a fixed tailwheel undercarriage.

Design and development
The A2N was originally developed as a private venture by Nakajima for the Imperial Japanese Navy. It was based loosely on the Boeing Model 69 and Boeing Model 100, examples of both having been imported in 1928 and 1929 respectively. Takao Yoshida led the design team and two prototypes, designated Navy Type 90 Carrier Fighter in anticipation of Navy acceptance, were ready by December 1929. Powered by Bristol Jupiter VI engines, these were rejected, not being regarded as offering a significant improvement over the Nakajima A1N.

Jingo Kurihara carried out a major redesign and another prototype, the A2N1, powered by a  Nakajima Kotobuki 2, was completed in May 1931. The type was adopted by the Navy in April 1932.

A two-seat trainer, the A3N3-1 (Navy Type 90 Training Fighter), was later developed from the Navy Type 90 Carrier Fighter and 66 of these were built between 1936 and 1939.

Operational history
In 1932, Minoru Genda formed a flight demonstration team known as "Genda's Flying Circus" to promote naval aviation and flew this type.
On what would become the first air battles of the Second Sino-Japanese War-Second World War for the air-combat units of these aircraft carriers, A2N fighter pilot Akio Matsuba from Kaga, flying air-cover in support of Japanese troop-landings in the Battle of Shanghai on 16 August 1937, shot-down a Chinese Air Force Douglas O-2M on an attack mission against Japanese forces in Shanghai. A2Ns were soon completely superseded by the A4Ns and A5Ms fighters.

Variants

A2N1(Navy Type 90-I Carrier Fighter) - Guns located in both sides of the nose, but few produced.
A2N2(Navy Type 90-II Carrier Fighter) - Guns transferred to the upper surface of the nose, the fuel tanks mounted on the fuselage sides.
A2N3(Navy Type 90-III Carrier Fighter) - principal production variant. 5° of dihedral on upper mainplane.
A3N3-1 (Navy Type 90 Training Fighter) two-seat trainer

Specifications (A2N1)

See also

References

Notes

Bibliography
 
 

A02N, Nakajima
Biplanes
A02N
Single-engined tractor aircraft
Aircraft first flown in 1929